Cruis'n Blast is a racing video game developed and published by Raw Thrills. Originally released for the arcades, it was released in 2017 and is the sixth installment in the Cruis'n series. The game was released for the Nintendo Switch on September 14, 2021 by Raw Thrills. The Nintendo Switch version includes additional modes, cars and tracks.

Gameplay 
Cruis'n Blast provides the same gameplay as its predecessors, where the player races on different tracks under a time limit to reach the goal, passing checkpoints along the way to help extend the time limit. The races take place in different locations, such as Death Valley, London, Rio de Janeiro, Madagascar, and Singapore. The game includes the ability to upgrade the car in order to have an edge in the race. Unlike the other Cruis'n games, this version does not have an ending scene if the player wins all the stages.

Development and release 

The game was licensed by Nintendo, who owns the trademark for the game. It was first play-tested under the beta names Cruis'n Adventure and Cruis'n Redline, before eventually becoming Cruis'n Blast. A trailer for the game was unveiled on October 24, 2016, on the Raw Thrills YouTube channel. 

The Nintendo Switch version was released on September 14, 2021.

Reception 

Cruis'n Blast on Nintendo Switch garnered "mixed or average reviews", according to review aggregator site Metacritic. Publishers like Polygon compared the action and races in the game to the Fast and Furious franchise, although they do acknowledge the fact it is a bit lacking in certain areas. In the review done by IGN they speak of the lackluster appeal when Cruis'n Blast at its core is an arcade game brought to the home console as it is a fun game but becomes boring quickly.

References

External links 

 
 Cruis'n Blast at MobyGames
 

 

2017 video games
Arcade video games
Cruis'n
Dinosaurs in video games
GameMill Entertainment games
Multiplayer and single-player video games
Nintendo Switch games
Video games developed in the United States
Video games set in Brazil
Video games set in Madagascar
Video games set in Singapore
Video games set in the United Kingdom
Video games set in the United States
Raw Thrills games